Catholic Organizations for Youth in Asia (COYA) is a network of Catholic youth organizations in Asia.

History
In 2007 the Youth Desk of the Federation of Asian Bishops' Conferences initiated a meeting of Catholic youth organizations active in Asia. COYA was founded in 2008.

Member organizations

References 

Catholic Church in Asia
Catholic youth organizations